Gleb Vannovsky (5 March 1862 – 17 October 1943) was an Imperial Russian army commander. He served in China and fought in the war against the Empire of Japan. After the October Revolution of 1917, he fought against the Bolsheviks. After the end of the civil war, he emigrated to France.

References
 Хроника // ПИ. 1922. 14 марта. № 59. С. 4; ГАЭ. Ф. 1. Оп. 7. Ед. хр. 28. Л. 207;
 ГАЭ. Ф. 646. Оп. 1. Ед. хр. 38. Л. 141; ГАЭ. Ф. 646. Оп. 1. Ед. хр. 162. Л. 1;
 ГАЭ. Ф. 650. Оп. 2. Ед. хр. 31;
 Kxrgem Sxjakool 1921—1931. Tallinn, 1931. Lk. 55;
 Залесский К. А. Кто был кто в Первой мировой войне. М., 2003. С. 104—105;
 Волков С. В. Белое движение. Энциклопедия Гражданской войны. СПб.; М., 2003. С. 68.

1862 births
1943 deaths
Russian military personnel of the Boxer Rebellion
Russian military personnel of the Russo-Japanese War
Russian military personnel of World War I
People of the Russian Civil War